Rebecca Cohn (born March 30, 1954 in Vallejo, California) is an American politician who served as the California State Assembly member for the 24th District from 2000 to 2006. A resident of Saratoga, her district also included the Buena Vista, Burbank, Cambrian Park, and Fruitdale neighbourhoods of San Jose, the city of Campbell, parts of both unincorporated Santa Clara County, and the city of Santa Clara, as well as a section of the town of Los Gatos.  Cohn is a Democrat. She left office in 2007 because of term limits, and was succeeded by Jim Beall. In August 2008, she enrolled at the University of California, Davis School of Law (King Hall).

Background
Born Rebecca Wilson, Cohn grew up in Fredericksburg, Texas. She has four brothers and while living in the Texas Hillcountry her brothers and her were frequent guests at the Lyndon Johnson Ranch. She graduated from Fredericksburg High School and earned a bachelor's degree from the University of Texas in 1976. She converted to Judaism in anticipation of marriage to her first husband, a doctor. Cohn, divorced from entrepreneur Ron Cohn, lives in Campbell and has one son.

Before politics
As a management consultant, Cohn guided various companies in Silicon Valley and throughout the world through the adoption of new technologies and practices. She gained skills in negotiating labor and management disputes during her time in the private sector.

California Assembly
Cohn served as Assistant Majority Leader during her time in the Assembly. Cohn was a member of the committees on Arts, Entertainment, Sports, Tourism and Internet Media, Health, Public Safety, and the Utilities and Commerce. Cohn was instrumental in the development of the state's Medical Examiner competency exam and the establishment of treatment guidelines. She has been active on other boards including: the American Physical Therapy Association's Advisory Panel on Women, the Diversity Task, Force of Joint Venture Silicon Valley, the Santa Clara Board of Supervisor's Domestic Violence Council, and the Board of Directors for the Support of Battered Women.

Controversy
In 2004, she faced a lawsuit from former employees alleging they had been made to do campaign work on state time. In the same year, another employee claimed he was unjustly fired for writing a critical letter about her during a controversial software contract investigation. In 2005, Cohn came under heat for her spicy San Jose Magazine photo shoot that prompted two aides to sue her for allegedly creating a sexually charged work environment (they alleged that Cohn had required them to handle and hold Cohn's bras and panties during outfit changes for the photo shoot).  The California Legislature later settled the lawsuit on her behalf, without her consent. She admitted no fault and took no part in the settlement.

Electoral history

References

1954 births
Living people
Democratic Party members of the California State Assembly
Jewish American state legislators in California
University of Texas at Austin alumni
People from Campbell, California
People from Fredericksburg, Texas
Women state legislators in California
Converts to Judaism
University of California, Davis alumni
21st-century American politicians
21st-century American women politicians
Politicians from Vallejo, California
21st-century American Jews